In geometry, a base is a side of a polygon or a face of a polyhedron, particularly one oriented perpendicular to the direction in which height is measured, or on what is considered to be the "bottom" of the figure. This term is commonly applied to triangles, parallelograms, trapezoids, cylinders, cones, pyramids, parallelepipeds and frustums.

Role in area and volume calculation
Bases are commonly used (together with heights) to calculate the areas and volumes of figures. In speaking about these processes, the measure (length or area) of a figure's base is often referred to as its "base."

By this usage, the area of a parallelogram or the volume of a prism or cylinder can be calculated by multiplying its "base" by its height; likewise, the areas of triangles and the volumes of cones and pyramids are fractions of the products of their bases and heights. Some figures have two parallel bases (such as trapezoids and frustums), both of which are used to calculate the extent of the figures.

Extended bases in trigonometry

The extended base of a triangle (a particular case of an extended side) is the line that contains the base. The extended base is important in the context of obtuse triangles: the altitudes from the acute vertices are external to the triangle and perpendicularly intersect the extended opposite base (but not the base proper).

See also
 Apex (geometry)

References

Parts of a triangle
Area
Volume